Ralf Steudel (* 25 March 1937  – 12 February 2021) was a German chemist and university professor who was known for his research in the area of sulfur chemistry as well as for his textbook Chemistry of the Non-Metals, which appeared in several languages and many editions. Complementing his pioneering contributions to polysulfides, he authored many reviews on the subject.

Steudel was born to a family of entrepreneurs in the Saxonian town of Kamenz. In 1954 he escaped to West Berlin, and started his university studies in chemistry in 1957 at the Free University Berlin under the supervision of Peter Wolfgang Schenk, whose research focused on sulfur monoxide and related chalcogen compounds..Steudel graduated in 1963. In 1965, he received his PhD in chemistry at the Technical University Berlin (TUB) where he subsequently made his habilitation work resulting in the venia legendi for inorganic chemistry in 1969. 
In the same year he was appointed professor of inorganic chemistry at TUB, a position he held until his retirement in 2003. In 1973/74 he spent 1 year as a visiting professor at the Spectroscopy Laboratory of the Massachusetts Institute of Technology  (MIT) in Cambridge, Massachusetts.

Research
Steudel made many contributions to the chemistry of sulfur.  His group prepared several new allotropes, often using titanocene pentasulfide. Two examples are S11 and S13, which resulted from the titanocene reagent and S6Cl2 and S8Cl2, respectively. He also discovered routes to the lower sulfur oxides. One example is S8O.   Much of his work benefited from the use of high performance liquid chromatography (HPLC) to analyze reaction and to assess purity. Using HPLC, he established the existence of rings up to S18 and beyond.

Publications (textbooks) 
 (with D. Scheschkewitz): Chemistry of the Non-Metals, 2nd ed., Berlin; Boston, Mass.: de Gruyter, 2019, 760 pages, .
 (ed.): Anorganische Chemie: Prinzipien von Struktur und Reaktivität, Authors: James E. Huheey, Ellen A. Keiter, Richard L. Keiter, 5th Edition, Berlin; Boston, Mass.: de Gruyter, 2014, .

External links

 Website on the Research Activities by R. Steudel and his group  der Technischen Universität Berlin, retrieved 15 August 2010.

References

1937 births
Living people
21st-century German chemists
Academic staff of the Technical University of Berlin
20th-century German chemists